Nova Ushytsia Raion was one of the 20 administrative raions (a district) of Khmelnytskyi Oblast in western Ukraine. Its administrative center was located in the urban-type settlement of Nova Ushytsia. Its population was 36,457  in the 2001 Ukrainian Census. The raion was abolished on 18 July 2020 as part of the administrative reform of Ukraine, which reduced the number of raions of Khmelnytskyi Oblast to three. The area of Nova Ushytsia Raion was merged into Kamianets-Podilskyi Raion. The last estimate of the raion population was

Geography
Nova Ushytsia Raion was located in the south-central part of Khmelnytskyi Oblast, corresponding to the modern-day boundaries of the Volhynia and Podolia historical regions. Its total area constituted  and about 3.9 percent of the oblast's area.

History
Nova Ushytsia Raion was first established on March 7, 1923 as part of a full-scale administrative reorganization of the Ukrainian Soviet Socialist Republic.

Subdivisions

At the time of disestablishment, the raion consisted of one hromada, Nova Ushytsia settlement hromada with the administration in Nova Ushytsia.

Nova Ushytsia Raion was divided in a way that followed the general administrative scheme in Ukraine. Local government was also organized along a similar scheme nationwide. Consequently, raions were subdivided into councils, which were the prime level of administrative division in the country.

Each of the raion's urban localities administered their own councils, often containing a few other villages within its jurisdiction. However, only a handful of rural localities were organized into councils, which also might contain a few villages within its jurisdiction.

Accordingly, the Nova Ushytsia Raion was divided into: 
 1 settlement council—made up of the urban-type settlement of Nova Ushytsia (administrative center)
 21 village councils

Overall, the raion had a total of 59 populated localities, consisting of one urban-type settlement, 57 villages, and one rural settlement.

References

External links

 

Former raions of Khmelnytskyi Oblast
States and territories established in 1923
1923 establishments in Ukraine
Ukrainian raions abolished during the 2020 administrative reform